Piper regale is a species of plant in the family Piperaceae. It is endemic to Ecuador.

References

Flora of Ecuador
regale
Endangered plants
Taxonomy articles created by Polbot